Edward, Eddie or Ed Griffin may refer to:
Edward Griffin (parson), Irish parson of the parish of Coolock in the 16th century
Edward Griffin (attorney), Solicitor General and Attorney General for England and Wales, 1545–1559
Sir Edward Griffin (MP) (1603–1670), British MP, 1640–1644, and Treasurer of the Chamber, 1660–1679
Edward Griffin, 1st Baron Griffin of Braybrooke, British Treasurer of the Chamber, 1679–1689
Edward Dorr Griffin (1770–1837), American clergyman and president of Williams College, 1821–1836
G. Edward Griffin (born 1931), American film producer, author, and conspiracy theorist
Ed Griffin, co-wrote the song "Everywhere" for the film A Room for Romeo Brass
Eddie Griffin (born 1968), American actor and comedian
Eddie Griffin (basketball) (1982–2007), American professional basketball player
Eddie Griffin (coach), American wrestling coach at Clemson University and University of Central Oklahoma
Ted Griffin (orca capturer) (Edward Griffin), aquarium owner and entrepreneur

See also
Ted Griffin (born 1970), American screenwriter
Ted Griffin (footballer) (1913–1998), Australian rules footballer